Threatt is a surname. Notable people with the surname include:

Elizabeth Threatt (1926-1993), American model and actress
Jay Threatt (born 1989), American basketball player
Sedale Threatt (born 1961), American basketball player
Sedale Threatt Jr. (born 1981), American basketball player